Bohr-e Bagh (also Romanized as Bohr-e Bāgh; also known as Bahr and Bohr) is a village in Jam Rural District, in the Central District of Jam County, Bushehr Province, Iran. At the 2006 census, its population was 1,204, in 283 families.

References 

Populated places in Jam County